Brodzic is a Polish coat of arms. It was used by several szlachta families in the times of the Polish–Lithuanian Commonwealth.

Blazon
The coat of arms is composed of three gold crosses, placed on a gold circle in the crotches. The crest with five ostrich feathers, all on a field of red.

Notable bearers
Notable bearers of this coat of arms include:
 Stanisław Żochowski
 Kyprian Zochovskyj
 Vyacheslav Lypynsky

See also
 Polish heraldry
 Heraldic family
 List of Polish nobility coats of arms

Bibliography
 Tadeusz Gajl: Herbarz polski od średniowiecza do XX wieku : ponad 4500 herbów szlacheckich 37 tysięcy nazwisk 55 tysięcy rodów. L&L, 2007. .
 Elżbieta Sączys: Szlachta wylegitymowana w Królestwie Polskim w latach 1836-1861. DiG, 2007. 

Brodzic